Nawalpur or (Nawalparasi east of Bardaghat Susta) is a district located in Gandaki Province of Nepal. It is 1 out of 11 districts of Gandaki Province. The headquarter of the district is Kawasoti.

Formally Nawalpur District was part of Nawalparasi District, which split into two districts Nawalpur District and Parasi District after the state's reconstruction of administrative divisions as of 20 September 2015.

History
During Rana regime, Nawalpur district was a sub-district of Chitwan District then it established separately and again merged with a small portion (Parasi) of Butwal District and established Nawalparasi District. In 2015 again Nawalpur District was again separately reestablished.

Divisions
The district is divided into 8 local level body in which 4 are urban municipality and 4 are rural municipality.

Urban municipality
 Kawasoti (Headquarter)
 Gaindakot
 Devachuli
 Madhyabindu

Rural municipality
 Baudikali
 Bulingtar
 Binayi Tribeni
 Hupsekot

Demographics 
At the time of the 2011 census, Nawalpur District had a population of 311,604. Of these, 55.3% spoke Nepali, 25.2% Magar, 11.0% Tharu, 1.9% Gurung, 1.6% Newari, 1.2% Bhojpuri, 0.8% Tamang, 0.7% Kumhali, 0.5% Bote, 0.4% Khash, 0.4% Maithili, 0.3% Darai, 0.2% Hindi, 0.1% Bhujel, 0.1% Majhi, 0.1% Urdu and 0.1% other languages as their first language.

In terms of ethnicity/caste, 29.1% were Magar, 23.8% Hill Brahmin, 11.8% Tharu, 7.7% Chhetri, 5.4% Kami, 3.9% Kumal, 2.9% Gurung, 2.9% Newar, 2.5% Damai/Dholi, 1.8% Thakuri, 1.4% Tamang, 1.0% Sarki, 0.8% other Dalit, 0.7% Bote, 0.6% Darai, 0.6% Sanyasi/Dasnami, 0.5% Musalman, 0.4% Gharti/Bhujel, 0.3% Musahar, 0.2% Badi, 0.2% Kathabaniyan, 0.2% Rai, 0.1% Koiri/Kushwaha, 0.1% Kurmi, 0.1% Majhi, 0.1% Mallaha, 0.1% Sunuwar, 0.1% Teli, 0.1% other Terai, 0.1% Yadav and 0.2% others.

In terms of religion, 87.8% were Hindu, 8.7% Buddhist, 2.7% Christian, 0.5% Muslim, 0.1% Prakriti and 0.1% others.

In terms of literacy, 74.7% could read and write, 2.1% could only read and 23.1% could neither read nor write.

See also
 Parasi District

References

External links
 MoFALD
 DCC Nawalparasi

 
Districts of Nepal established during Rana regime or before
Gandaki Province
Districts of Nepal established in 2015